This is a list of fellows of the Royal Society elected in 1680.

Fellows 
Peter Perkins  (d. 1680)
Jonas Moore  (d. 1682)
Jacobus Pighius  (1647–1682)
John Wood  (d. 1682)
Johann Christian Heusch  (1680–1684)
Andrew Clench  (d. 1692)
Thomas Firmin  (1632–1697)
John Houghton  (1645–1705)
Denis Papin  (1647–1712)
Robert Nelson  (1656–1715)
Antoni van Leeuwenhoek  (1632–1723)
Frederick Slare  (1647–1727)

References

1680
1680 in science
1680 in England